David Robert Layzell is an Australian politician who has served in the New South Wales Legislative Assembly as the member for Upper Hunter for the NSW Nationals since May 2021.

Dave Layzell is a former construction manager. Dave Layzell was elected to the New South Wales Legislative Assembly at the 2021 Upper Hunter state by-election.

Personal life 
David Layzell is married to Rachel Layzell and the couple have four daughters - Emily, Mia, Ashley and Indie. He was educated at The Armidale School and attained a Building degree from the University of New South Wales, while also being a member of the Kensington - Baxter Colleges.

Political career 
David Layzell was preselected as the NSW National Party Candidate in the Upper Hunter By-Election following the resignation of former MP Michael Johnsen over sexual assault allegations. David won the By-Election on 22 May with a 2 candidate preferred 3% swing towards the NSW National Party, despite comments from Premier Gladys Berejiklian that "it would take more than a miracle for us to keep the seat". The By-Election also saw 7.46% and 10% first preference swings against the NSW Labor Party and NSW Shooters, Fishers and Farmers respectively.

David Layzell was officially sworn in as a member of the 57th Parliament of NSW on Tuesday 8 June 2021, where he also asked his first question in question time to the Deputy Premier Hon. John Barilaro. David gave his first speech in parliament on Wednesday 9 June 2021.

References

External links
 

Living people
People from the Hunter Region
National Party of Australia members of the Parliament of New South Wales
Members of the New South Wales Legislative Assembly
Year of birth missing (living people)
Place of birth missing (living people)
21st-century Australian politicians